Jeongwang-dong is a dong situated in the city of Siheung, Gyeonggi-do, South Korea. The neighbourhood is divided into one main division; Jeongwang-dong (정왕동) and four subdivisions; Jeongwang 1-dong (정왕1동), Jeongwang 2-dong (정왕2동), Jeongwang 3-dong (정왕3동) and Jeongwang 4-dong (정왕4동). Together, these areas make up a total population of about 155,500 and an area of about 33 square kilometres.

Development of Jeongwang-dong
January 1, 1989: Jeongwang-dong was established in Siheung, Korea.

September 27, 1999 : Jeongwang 1-dong is created from Jeongwang 1 and Jeongwang 2. 

March 2, 2002: Jeongwang 2-dong is created from Jeongwang 2-dong, Jeongwang 3-dong, and Jeongwang 4-dong. 

January 1, 2004: Jeongwang 3-dong is created from Jeongwangbon-dong and Jeongwang 1-dong. 

October 8, 2018: Jeongwang 4-dong is established.

See also 
Administrative divisions of South Korea
List of cities and counties of Gyeonggi Province
Jeongwang station

References

Siheung